Viktor Svensson (born 6 March 1990) is a retired Swedish footballer.

He last played for Landskrona BoIS as a defender.

References

External links

 (archive)

1990 births
Living people
Association football midfielders
Trelleborgs FF players
Landskrona BoIS players
Allsvenskan players
Superettan players
Swedish footballers